AGM or agm may refer to:

Military
 Air-to-ground missile, a missile designed to be launched from military aircraft 
 Artillery Gun Module, an air-portable self-propelled howitzer
 Missile Range Instrumentation Ship (US Navy hull classification symbol), a special type of ship for launching and tracking missiles and rockets

Organisations
 Active Gaming Media, a game localization company based in Japan
 Apollo Global Management, an American private equity firm
 Art Gallery of Mississauga, an art gallery in Canada
 Federal Agricultural Mortgage Corporation (NYSE symbol), a US loan and mortgage company

Science and technology
 AGM postulates, a set of conditions describing knowledge and belief revision
 Absorbent glass mat, a technology used in some models of VRLA battery
 Aorta-gonad-mesonephros, a part of chicken, mouse, and human embryos
 Arithmetic–geometric mean, a function of two positive numbers that is between the arithmetic mean and the geometric mean

Other uses
 Angaataha language (ISO 639-3 code)
 Annual general meeting, a meeting of the general membership of an organization
 Award of Garden Merit, by the British Royal Horticultural Society
 Tasiilaq Heliport (IATA airport code), Greenland